Lucas Martín Matthysse (born 27 September 1982) is an Argentine former professional boxer who competed from 2004 to 2018. He held the WBA (Regular) welterweight title in 2018 and the WBC interim super lightweight title from 2012 to 2013. Matthysse was known for his aggressive pressure fighting style and formidable punching power. He is the younger brother of former featherweight world champion of boxing, Edith Soledad Matthysse.

Amateur career
During his amateur career, Matthysse fought in the 2003 Pan American Games at Santo Domingo, Dominican Republic, where he went on to stop Colombia's Breidis Prescott in just the first round.

Lucas has faced Marcos Maidana four times in the amateurs with Maidana winning three times while fighting the fourth to a draw.

Professional career

Light welterweight
In June 2004, Lucas won his pro debut against Leandro Almagro, on a card that also featured his brother Walter.

Matthysse vs. Judah
On 6 November 2010 Matthysse lost a very disputed split decision against former world champion Zab Judah in the main event of an HBO card. Judah began the busier fighter, using the jab and trying to land uppercuts for the first two rounds, while Matthysse worked on the body. In round three, a clash of heads opened a cut outside of the left eye of Judah. Matthysse displayed more aggression and became the aggressor in the third and the fourth round and Judah switched to a defensive tactic. In the next two rounds, the American boxer picked up the pace, beginning to land more combinations. Judah continued to box throughout the ninth round but Matthysse began to show more power in the tenth, focusing on the head of his opponent and knocking down the American boxer after a hard right hand to the jaw. Judah got up, but he was hurt. The Argentine fighter tried to press the attack after the knockdown. Two judges scored the fight 114–113 for Judah, while the other judge scored it 114–113 for Matthysse.

Matthysse vs. Alexander
On 25 June 2011 Matthysse faced former world champion Devon Alexander and lost another close, but hugely controversial split decision. The judges in the Family Arena in St. Charles had the fight 96–93 and 95–94 for Alexander, and 96–93 for Matthysse.

Matthysse vs. Martínez, Soto and Olusegun
Lucas was forced to withdraw from a fight versus Erik Morales in one of the featured bouts on the Floyd Mayweather Jr. vs. Victor Ortiz HBO PPV undercard at the MGM Grand in Paradise, Nevada, citing a viral infection that had kept him from training.

Lucas fought Mexican Martín Ángel Martínez on 10 February 2012 for the vacant WBA Inter-Continental light welterweight title at the Gimnasio Municipal, Chubut, Argentina in a scheduled 12 round bout. The Mexican retired after the 5th round.

The stay-busy victory over the 20-year-old Mexican fighter set up a Showtime televised showdown between Matthysse and former 130-pound and lightweight beltholder Humberto Soto on 23 June 2012. Both fighters traded big shots in the opening rounds but the Matthysse was able to land consistent big body shots and came through this fight with another fifth round TKO.

Matthysse then faced undefeated Nigerian-born British professional boxer Ajose Olusegun on 8 September 2012. Olusegun had been declared the mandatory challenger for the WBC light welterweight title going into the fight. The first few rounds were good exchanges for the two brawlers. However, on the tenth round the hard punches from the Argentinian proved too much for the unbeaten Nigerian and therefore the referee stopped the fight via 10th round TKO.

Matthysse vs. Peterson
On 18 May 2013 Matthysse faced Lamont Peterson in a non title match in Atlantic City, New Jersey. At the end of the second round Matthysse landed a hard right hand to the body followed of a left hook to the head, that knocked Peterson down. In the third round Matthysse kept the pressure on Peterson, knocking him down twice in that round. At 46 seconds of round 3 referee Steve Smoger stopped the fight after the second Peterson knock down. The winner via TKO was Matthysse.

After the fight, Golden Boy Promotions CEO, Richard Schaefer, declared Matthysse the next Manny Pacquiao.

The victory was considered the biggest of Matthysse's career, and his first step in the door to super stardom. He then faced unified 140 lb champion Danny García on 14 September 2013 as part of the undercard to the Floyd Mayweather vs. Saul Alvarez main event.

Matthysse vs. García
Going into his fight on 14 September against García, Matthysse was a heavy favorite despite being the challenger. Nevertheless, García stood firm and fought a mature fight, trading rounds early with Matthysse. In the middle rounds, Matthysse developed an injury to his right eye from García's flinched right hand, which the young champ exploited. Matthysee bravely battled back, but García knocked him down in the 11th round, a first for the challenger. The twelfth round saw García lose a point for a low blow, and ended in a slug-fest. The last ten seconds of round 12 proved thrilling, both fighters went toe to toe. In the end, the judges handed García a unanimous decision: 115–111, 114–112 and 114–112.

Matthysse vs. Postol
On 3 October 2015 Matthysse once again went in as a solid favorite to defeat the undefeated Ukrainian Viktor Postol. But Postol was able to take advantage of his four-inch reach advantage and outwork Matthysse from the outside before sealing the fight with a counter right hand that knocked Matthysse down. Matthysse then made no attempt to get up from the canvas citing a potential injury in his eye in his post-fight interview. He would spend a year-and-a-half out of the ring after undergoing eye surgery and taking time off to recover.

Matthysse vs. Taylor 
On 6 May, 2017, Matthysse fought Emanuel Taylor. Matthysse won the fight via a technical knockout in the fifth round.

Matthysse vs. Kiram 
In his next fight, Matthysse fought Tewa Kiram, who was ranked #1 by the WBA at welterweight. Matthysse managed to knockout his opponent in the eighth round to come out with the victory.

Matthysse vs. Pacquiao

Matthysse lost his WBA (Regular) welterweight title against Manny Pacquiao on 15 July 2018 at the Axiata Arena in Kuala Lumpur. Pacquiao won the fight via TKO in round 7, marking the first time in nine years that Pacquiao had finished an opponent. Matthysse subsequently announced his retirement from boxing on 2 August 2018.

Professional boxing record

References

External links

Lucas Matthysse profile at Golden Boy Promotions
Lucas Matthysse - Profile, News Archive & Current Rankings at Box.Live

1982 births
Living people
Argentine male boxers
Light-welterweight boxers
World welterweight boxing champions
Boxers at the 2003 Pan American Games
People from Trelew
World Boxing Association champions
Pan American Games competitors for Argentina